Gübsensee is a reservoir near the city of St. Gallen, Switzerland. Its dams were built between 1898 and 1900, the first hydroelectric reservoir in Switzerland. Kraftwerk Kubel has generated electrical power there since 1900.

Gübsensee Ost is a gravity dam with a height of 24 m, Gübsensee West an earthfill dam.

Its volume is 1.5 mio m³.

The Gübsensee and the surrounding area is today protected as a nature reserve

External links
Swiss Dams: Gübsensee Ost

Swiss Dams: Gübsensee West

Lakes of the canton of St. Gallen
Reservoirs in Switzerland
Infrastructure completed in 1900
RGubsensee